Sderot (lit. Boulevards) is a western Negev city and former development town in the Southern District of Israel.

Sderot is located less than a mile from Gaza (the closest point is 840 m).

History
Sderot was originally founded in 1951 as a transit camp called Gabim Dorot for Israeli immigrants, primarily from Kurdistan and Iran, who numbered 80 families. The development was located on the land of the Palestinian village  of Najd which was depopulated during 1948 Arab-Israeli War and served as part of a chain of settlements designed to block infiltration from Gaza. Permanent housing was completed three years after the transit camp's establishment in 1954. The town was renamed Sderot after the Eucalyptus boulevard planted along the length of the town, whose planting provided employment to the residents of the settlement.

From the mid-1950s Moroccan Jews increasingly settled in the township. Romanian Jewish and Kurdish Jewish immigrants also began settling in Sderot. In 1956, Sderot was recognized as a local council. In the 1961 census, the percentage of North African immigrants, mostly from Morocco, was 87% in the town; another 11% of the residents were immigrants from Kurdistan.

Sderot received a symbolic name, after the numerous avenues and standalone rows of trees planted in the Negev, especially between Beersheba and Gaza, to combat desertification and beautify the arid landscape. Like many other localities in the Negev, Sderot's name has a green motif that symbolizes the motto "making the desert bloom", a central part of Zionist ideology.

Sderot absorbed another large wave of immigrants from the former Soviet Union during the 1990s Post-Soviet aliyah, and also took in immigrants from Ethiopia during this time. Its population doubled as a result. In 1996, it was declared a city.

During the Second Intifada, the city became a target for rockets from the Gaza Strip, starting in 2001. Rocket fire intensified after the Israeli disengagement from Gaza in 2005. The population declined as families left the city in desperation.

During the Gaza War in December 2008 and January 2009, between 50 and 60 rockets were fired at Sderot per week, causing about half the city's residents to temporarily evacuate. The war ended regular rocket fire from Gaza and the city experienced a revitalization. By 2009, demand for apartments was outweighing supply, a new sports complex largely funded by donor aid had opened, a new shopping mall was being built, and the assistance that the city had received due to concern over the years of rocket fire meant that Sderot now had better community, educational, and recreational services than many other Negev development towns. The city sustained rocket fire on occasion over the following years, including during Operation Protective Edge. However, the introduction of the Iron Dome rocket defense system reduced the effectiveness of this rocket fire, with many of these rockets being intercepted.

In May 2011, the British Ambassador to Israel visited Sderot and met with Mayor David Buskila, who described the suffering of children in both Sderot and Gaza:
"Believe me that I feel bad for my children, for the children that live here in Sderot, but I also feel pain for the children that live in the other side of the border in Gaza ... This situation that the children from this place and the other place is because of the behaviour of the leaders of the terror organisations. We can create another quality of life, it is so close."

In October 2013, Alon Davidi was elected as Mayor of Sderot.

Demographics
According to CBS, in 2010 the city had a population of 21,900. The national makeup of the city was 94% Jewish, 5.5% other non-Arabs, and Arabs less than 1%. There were 10,600 males and 10,500 females. The population growth rate in 2010 was 0.5%.

A number of Palestinians from the Gaza Strip were resettled in Sderot beginning in 1997 after cooperating with the Shin Bet.

Economy
In 2008, the average wage for a salaried worker in Sderot was NIS 5,261.

Hollandia International, founded in 1981, a company that manufacturers and exports high-end mattresses, moved its sole manufacturing center to Sderot 11 years ago. Following the rocket attacks, Hollandia has been forced to relocate.

The Osem plant in Sderot, opened in 1981, is the region's major employer, with 480 workers. 170 products are manufactured there, including Bamba, Bisli, Mana Hama instant noodle and rice dishes, instant soup powders, shkedei marak, ketchup and sauces.

The Menorah Candle factory located in Sderot exports Hanukkah candles all over the world.

Nestlé maintains a research and development facility in Sderot, established in 2002. Its production facilities for breakfast cereals are also located in Sderot.

Amdocs has a plant in the Sderot and an industrial zone is under development.

In 2012, the government approved nearly $59 million worth of economic benefits for Sderot to strengthen the economy, boost employment and subsidize psycho-social programs for the city's residents.

Local government
In 2010, after a decline in charitable donations, the municipality revealed that it was on the verge of bankruptcy.

Education

According to CBS, there are 14 schools and 3,578 students in the city. They are spread out as eleven elementary schools and 2,099 elementary school students, and six high schools and 1,479 high school students. 56.5% of 12th grade students were entitled to a matriculation certificate in 2001. Sapir Academic College and the Hesder Yeshiva of Sderot are located in Sderot. All schools in the city and 120 bus stops have been fortified against missile attacks.

Culture
An unusually high ratio of singers, instrumentalists, composers and poets have come from Sderot.

Several popular bands have been formed by musicians who practiced in Sderot's bomb shelters as teenagers. As an immigrant town with high unemployment experiencing a dramatic musical success, as bands blend international sounds with the music of their Moroccan immigrant parents, it has been compared to Liverpool in the 1960s. Among the notable bands are Teapacks Knesiyat Hasekhel and Sfatayim. Well-known musicians from Sderot include Shlomo Bar, Kobi Oz, Haïm Ulliel and Smadar Levi.
The winner of the Israeli version of "American Idol" 2011 was Hagit Yaso, a local Sderot singer of Ethiopian origin.

Israeli poet Shimon Adaf was born in Sderot, as well as the actor and entertainer Maor Cohen. Adaf dedicated a poem to the city in his 1997 book Icarus' Monologue.

In 2007, Jewish-American documentary filmmaker Laura Bialis immigrated to Israel, and decided to settle in Sderot "to find out what it means to live in a never-ending war, and to document the lives and music of musicians under fire". Her film Sderot: Rock in the Red Zone focuses on young musicians living under the daily threat of Qassams.

Politically, the town leans heavily to the right.

The Israeli musician Dror Kessler, who lives in Sderot, has published Intifada Solitaire, a music album recorded  during “Operation Protective Edge”, in which he expressed a unique and local opinion, one that may be considered to be leaning to the left.

Sderot cinema 

Sderot cinema is a name given to gatherings at a hill in Sderot, where over 50 locals would come to watch the fighting in the Gaza strip during the 2014 Israel–Gaza conflict, cheering when bombs would strike. The name was coined by a Danish journalist who snapped a photo of it and posted it on Twitter. Similar events happened in Operation Cast Lead in 2009, after which some critics decided to refer to the hill as "Hill of Shame".

Sderot residents have complained about the media portrayal. Marc Goldberg noted in The Times of Israel that "it shouldn't surprise anyone that after suffering a huge amount of shelling over the course of several years, they are cheering the IDF attacking the weapons that have been turned on them."

Rocket fire from Gaza

Sderot lies one kilometer from the Gaza Strip and town of Beit Hanoun. Since 2001, during the beginning stage of the Second Intifada, and more so since the Israeli disengagement from Gaza in 2005, the city sustained constant rocket fire from Qassam rockets launched by Hamas and Islamic Jihad. The city continued to suffer from rocket fire until the Gaza War's end in 2009, which brought an end to regular rocket fire aimed at the city. However, the city has still suffered from rocket fire on occasion ever since. Despite the imperfect aim of these homemade projectiles, they caused deaths and injuries, as well as significant damage to homes and property, psychological distress and emigration from the city. The Israeli government installed a "Red Color" (צבע אדום) alarm system to warn citizens of impending rocket attacks, although its effectiveness was questioned. Citizens were only given 7–15 seconds to reach shelter after the sounding of the alarm.

In May 2007, a significant increase in shelling from Gaza prompted the temporary evacuation of thousands of residents. By November 23, 2007, 6,311 rockets had fallen on the city. Yediot Ahronoth reported that during the summer of 2007, 3,000 of the city's 22,000 residents (consisting mostly of the city's key upper and middle class residents) left for other areas, out of Qassam rocket range. Russian billionaire Arcadi Gaydamak organised a series of relief programs for residents unable to leave.
On December 12, 2007, after more than 20 rockets landed in the Sderot area in a single day, including a direct hit to one of the main avenues, Sderot mayor Eli Moyal announced his resignation, citing the government's failure to halt the rocket attacks. Moyal was persuaded to retract his resignation.

In January 2008, British journalist Seth Freedman of The Guardian described Sderot as a city of near-deserted streets and empty malls and cafes. In March 2008, the mayor said that the population had dropped by 10–15%, while aid organizations said the figure was closer to 25%. Many of the families that remained were those who could not afford to move out or were unable to sell their homes. Studies found that air raid sirens and explosions have caused severe psychological trauma in some residents. According to a study carried out at Sapir Academic College in 2007, some 75% of residents aged 4–18 were suffering from PTSD, including sleeping disorders and severe anxiety, in the wake of rocket attacks on the city, and 1,000 residents were receiving psychiatric treatment at the community mental health center. From mid-June 2007 to mid-February 2008, 771 rockets and 857 mortar bombs were fired at Sderot and the western Negev, an average of three or four each a day.

Casualties

Solidarity gestures

In a gesture of solidarity, El Al (Israel's national airline) named one of its Boeing 777 passenger planes Sderot (4X-ECE).

In January 2008, the Jewish Community Relations Council of New York organized a display of 4,200 red balloons outside the headquarters of the United Nations. Each balloon represented a Qassam rocket that had been fired into Sderot, where for years the town and its surrounding area have been under near-constant bombardment by thousands of rockets and mortar shells fired from Gaza. Consul David Saranga, who conceptualized the display, said he used the balloons as an opportunity to call upon the international community to stop ignoring what's happening in Israel. The balloon display made headlines in New York City papers as well as international publications.

In May 2019, the Israeli Air Force held a special flypast (aerial display) over Sderot (in addition to Yom Ha'atzmaut flypast), in order to salute the residents of Sderot who suffer continuously from Palestinian rocket attacks on Israel.

Lawsuits
In 2011, a Sderot resident filed a million dollar lawsuit against two Canadian organizations raising funds for a Canadian ship to join the Gaza flotilla. According to the lawyers, "The Canadian Boat's raison d'être is to aid and abet the terrorist organization that rules Gaza." The suit alleges that these actions violate Canadian laws that prohibit aid to terror groups.

Transportation

Sderot is accessible by Highway 34 and Route 232.

The Ashkelon–Beersheba railway, a new railway line which connected Sderot with Tel Aviv and Beersheba, was inaugurated in December 2013. The Sderot railway station located on the outskirts of the city at the southern entrance, was opened on December 24, 2013. It is the first in Israel to be armored against rocket fire.

Twin towns – sister cities
Sderot is twinned with:
 Antony, France
 Zehlendorf (Berlin), Germany

Notable people
Erez Biton, poet
Miri Bohadana, model
Kim Edri, beauty queen, and former Miss Israel
Kobi Oz, musician
Amir Peretz, politician former defense minister
Hagit Yaso, singer

See also
 List of Israeli twin towns and sister cities
 Merkhav Mugan
 Palestinian rocket attacks on Israel
 Jewish Agency for Israel

References

Bibliography

External links

Sderot Media Center
The Other Voice
Humanitarian aid organization in Sderot
Sderot; The Movie
Sderot portal—Hebrew
Sderot Information Center for the Western Negev
The committee for a secure Sderot
Sderot in The Washington Post
Sderot Journal: An Israeli Playground, Fortified Against Rockets

 
Cities in Southern District (Israel)
Cities in Israel
Development towns
Israeli casualties in the Second Intifada
Gaza–Israel conflict
Populated places established in 1951
Gaza envelope
1951 establishments in Israel